The Mediterranean Caper (also published as Mayday) is an action-adventure novel by Clive Cussler published in the United States in 1973.  This is the 1st published book featuring the author’s primary protagonist, Dirk Pitt.  It was nominated for an Edgar award by the Mystery Writers of America for "Best Paperback Original Novel of 1973."

Plot introduction
Dirk Pitt is up against an international drug smuggling ring and the evil Bruno Von Till, a German pilot who survived both World Wars to become one of the most ruthless smugglers in history.  The novel is set in the Aegean Sea, where Dirk Pitt has been sent with Al Giordino to assist Rudi Gunn, with an expedition being conducted by NUMA.

Plot summary

Dirk Pitt, Special Projects Director for the National Underwater and Marine Agency, and his Deputy Special Projects Director, Al Giordino, are traveling to their assignment in the Aegean Sea in Dirk's PBY Catalina when they receive a mayday distress call from the control tower at the nearby Brady Air Force Base on the Greek island of Thásos.  The tower reports that they are under aerial attack by a World War I era German Albatros D-3 biplane painted a startling bright yellow and bearing the familiar black Maltese Cross of World War I Germany.  The biplane, with its top speed of just 103 mph, is strafing the runways and destroying multimillion-dollar F-105 Starfire fighters and C-133 Cargomasters without a shred of resistance.  Dirk and Al, armed with nothing more than a couple of rifles in their World War Two flying boat face-off against the World War I fighter and its machine guns.  After a spectacular dogfight  they exit the field of battle victorious.

Dirk has been sent to the Aegean to meet Commander Rudi Gunn, captain of the NUMA research vessel First Attempt, to try to get to the bottom of the recent spate of mishaps on its current assignment.  The First Attempt is on a research expedition attempting to find a living fossil lovingly named The Teaser, which scientists believe may be living evidence of the development of the first mammal.

Following his fight with the biplane Dirk goes for a midnight swim and meets a beautiful young woman named Teri von Till whom he quickly seduces.  She invites him to dinner at her uncle's villa that evening where Pitt is introduced to the book's primary villain, Bruno von Till.  Pitt learns that von Till is an old comrade in arms of Lt. Kurt Hiebert, a World War I flying ace known as the Hawk of Macedonia, whose trademark was a bright yellow Albatross biplane.

After dinner, he confronts von Till about his involvement with the attack on the airfield and while von Till admits nothing he forces Pitt to leave the villa at gunpoint through a door that leads him into what is known as the Pit of Hades.  It is later explained that the Pit of Hades is a labyrinth once used in ancient Greek times when the villagers sentenced a convicted felon to death.  The person sentenced to die was given the choice of an instant death or choosing the Pit of Hades.  The labyrinth had only one entrance, a concealed exit, and roaming amongst the many passages was a hungry lion.  In recorded history no one had successfully found the exit before the lion found them.  While von Till does not have a lion he does have a very large white German Shepherd with which Dirk Pitt engages in a mortal struggle.

Following his successful escape Pitt is taken into custody when he returns to seek his revenge on Bruno von Till and is captured escaping the villa with Teri von Till as his prisoner.  It is later revealed that Bruno von Till has been under surveillance by agents of Interpol and Inspector  Hercules Zacynthus of the United States  Federal Bureau of Narcotics.  The inspector explains that von Till is suspected of being a world-class smuggler responsible for the transportation of all types of goods related to many heinous criminal acts.  These acts include the great Spanish gold theft in 1954 which nearly toppled the Spanish economy; the mysterious disappearance of 85 high-ranking Nazi officers from Germany at the end of World War II and their sudden reemergence in Buenos Aires; and the abduction of a bus full of teenage girls in Naples, Italy who were sold into white slavery in Casablanca.  The inspector now believes that von Till is attempting to smuggle nearly half a billion dollars worth of heroin into the United States using his fleet of cargo ships called Minerva Lines.

Despite the best efforts of Interpol, the Federal Bureau of Narcotics, Customs, and many other law enforcement agencies they have been unable to catch Bruno von Till transporting anything illegal on any of his ships.  Pitt eventually discovers that von Till, using the resources of his shipping line, has raised the sunken wrecks of the German U-boat U-19 and a Japanese I-Boat class submarine which he has been using as part of a smuggling operation.  Von Till has converted a German submarine into a completely automated smuggling craft that can be easily attached or detached from the holds of his cargo ships.

Using Pitt's surmises as a basis for action, the inspector launches a campaign to capture as many distributors of heroin in the United States as possible.  However, Pitt suspects that Bruno von Till is aware of the approach of Interpol and the Federal Bureau of Narcotics and he launches his own desperate mission with Al and members of the crew of the First Attempt in a last-ditch effort to stop von Till before he can escape and set up his nefarious drug smuggling operation somewhere else. Pitt succeeds in defeating von Till and finds a Teaser in the process for Admiral Sandecker.

Characters in "The Mediterranean Caper"
Captain Darius - Assistant to Colonel Zeno of the Greek gendarmerie as well as a traitor in the employ of Bruno von Till.
Lieutenant Kurt Heibert - World War I fighter ace known as the Hawk of Macedonia.  He served in Jagedestaffel 91, obtained 32 victories over the allies on the Macedonian front and was one of the outstanding aces of the Great War.  He was presumed shot down and lost in the Aegean Sea on July 15, 1918.
Captain Al Giordino Deputy Special Projects Director for the National Underwater and Marine Agency.
Commander Rudi Gunn Captain of the NUMA research vessel First Attempt and commander of the expedition.
Dr. Ken Knight - A brilliant Marine geophysicist assigned to the research ship First Attempt.
Colonel Lewis - Commander of Brady Air Force Base.
Major Dirk Pitt of the United States Air Force now seconded to The National Underwater and Marine Agency as Special Projects Director
Admiral James Sandecker - Chief Director of the National Underwater and Marine Agency.
Bruno von Till - Owner and operator of the Minerva steamship line which he uses as part of a nefarious smuggling operation.  Introduced as a World War I fighter pilot it is later revealed that von Till is in actuality Admiral Erich Hiebert; Commander of Nazi Germany's transportation fleet; fanatical follower of Adolf Hitler; and brother of Kurt Hiebert, the World War I ace.  Hiebert was convicted in absentia by the International Military Tribunal at Nuremberg and sentenced to death for loading decrepit merchant ships with British and American prisoners of war and setting them adrift to be bombed by British and American pilots.
 Teri von Till - Niece of Bruno von Till. She is later revealed to be an undercover agent of the Federal Bureau of Narcotics working for inspector Zacynthus. Her real name is revealed as Amy.
 Inspector  Hercules Zacynthus - Federal Bureau of Narcotics inspector who is the head of a multi-national,  multi-jurisdictional task force under the auspices of Interpol.  Zacynthus is in Greece attempting to foil the smuggling operation of von Till and stop a massive shipment of heroin from reaching the United States.
Colonel Polyclitus Anaxamander Zeno - second in command of the task force and Commander of the Greek gendarmerie, a branch of the national army.

Allusions/references to other works
Dirk Pitt quotes a brief line of "The Inchcape Rock" by Robert Southey, "No stir in the air, no stir in the sea, the ship was still as she could be.” while describing his feelings when observing a completely automated vessel.

Allusions/references to actual history, geography and current science
The Mediterranean Caper is different from most novels in the pantheon of the Pitt thrillers in that it does not start with a prologue set in the past.  However, a number of true life people and events are mentioned during the course of the novel.  These would include the spy Mata Hari, the ghost ships Mary Celeste and Flying Dutchman, and a variety of Nazi war criminals including Martin Bormann and Hermann Göring.  A reference is also made to the gruesome keelhauling of a sailor on HMS Confident in 1786  The novel also refers to Ceylon, which by the time it was published had been renamed Sri Lanka.

Notes

1973 American novels
Dirk Pitt novels
Novels set in Greece
Aviation novels
Books with cover art by Paul Bacon
1973 debut novels
Pyramid Books books